RHN could mean:

 Royal Naval Hospital, a hospital operated by the British Royal Navy
 Ryan Nugent-Hopkins, ice hockey player
 Ribonuclease H, a family of endonuclease enzymes
 RNH1, Ribonuclease inhibitor, human gene
 New Richmond Regional Airport, IATA code: RNH